St Mary Magdalene's Church, Launceston is a Grade I listed parish church in the Church of England in Launceston, Cornwall. It is unusual for its carvings; the entire exterior of the original part of the church is built of carved granite blocks. The church is dedicated to Jesus' companion, Mary Magdalene.

History
The origins of the church date from the 12th century, but all except for the tower has been replaced. The church was under the management of Launceston Priory.

The current building, except for the tower, dates from 1511 to 1524 and was built by Sir Henry Trecarrel of Trecarrel as a memorial to his infant son.

After the dissolution of Launceston Priory in 1539 the management transferred to the Corporation who took on the responsibility of appointing curates and repairs to the building. Around 1550, the lead work needed repair, and the Corporation employed a plumber to recast and relay it. In 1640 the Mayor paid for new glass for the church windows.

In 1718 a west end gallery was built to increase the accommodation available at services. Iron railings were purchased in 1809 from the Tavistock Foundry, at a cost of £222 8s. 3d.. Following an appeal for scrap metal, the iron railings were removed at the start of the Second World War.

In 1852 the pillars of the church were straightened and the roof was replaced. The plans for the work were prepared by D. Barton Esq, and the contact undertaken by Messrs Gill and Ede, builders of Launceston. The organ was dismantled and cleaned by two local townsmen, Messrs Geake and Lane. The church re-opened for worship on 28 December 1852 in the presence of the Mayor, Justices and other members of the corporation.

It was restored in 1894 at a cost of £3,000 under the plans of John Dando Sedding, but he died before the work could be carried out, and it was managed by Edmund Harold Sedding and Henry Wilson. A side chapel was added to the south aisle of the church. New seating was provided in the north and south aisles, and oak benches provided for the centre aisles. New choirs stalls were also provided, wood carving was done by Charles Trask and Sons, Stoke-under-Ham, Illminster. Stonework was done by William Burt of Newport, Launceston.

The organ was moved to its present location in 1904. The gallery was taken down in 1910. It cost £600.

Vicars

Organ
The church has had organs since before the English Civil War. An organ was installed in 1723, probably by Thomas Swarbrick.  The donor was either Sir William Morice, 3rd Baronet (1707–1750) or his successor Humphry Morice MP (1723–1785). 
This has had numerous modifications over the years. A specification of the organ can be found on the National Pipe Organ Register.

Organists
Robert Martin ca.1760 - 1800
Philip Martin 1800 - 1830
Thomas Peter Hamlin 1830 - 1871
Thomas Dalby 1871 - 1898 (Formerly organist at St Wystan's Church, Repton and New Romney, Kent)
William Clotworthy ???? - 1907 (afterwards organist of St Eustachius' Church, Tavistock)
David John Coldwell FRCO 1907 - 1943
Royland Jordan 1945 -

Bells
The tower contains a peal of 8 bells cast by  John Taylor & Company of Loughborough in 1938.

References

Further reading
Toy, Henry Spencer The Parish Church of St. Mary Magdalene Launceston. Launceston: Parochial Church Council, 1963 

Launceston
Launceston
Launceston, Cornwall
18th-century Church of England church buildings